Jardin is a commune in the Isère department in southeastern France. It is a suburb of Vienne. It is located 4 km from the centre of Vienne and 35 km south of Lyon.

History
The name 'Jardin' is French for 'garden', reflecting the area's traditional history as a vegetable garden serving the town of Vienne and the manor of Montleans.

Population

Twin towns
Jardin is twinned with:

  Stanghella, Italy, since 2002

See also
Communes of the Isère department

References

Communes of Isère